Conus luciae is a species of sea snail, a marine gastropod mollusk in the family Conidae, the cone snails and their allies.

Like all species within the genus Conus, these snails are predatory and venomous. They are capable of "stinging" humans, therefore live ones should be handled carefully or not at all.

Description
The size of the shell varies between 21 mm and 62 mm.

Distribution
This marine species occurs in the Coral Sea and off New Caledonia.

References

 Moolenbeek, R., 1986. Studies on Conidae (Mollusca: Gastropoda), 6. Conidae of the Chesterfields Island, with description of Conus luciae nova species. Bulletin Zoologisch Museum Universiteit van Amsterdam 10(25): 209–214
 Tucker J.K. & Tenorio M.J. (2009) Systematic classification of Recent and fossil conoidean gastropods. Hackenheim: Conchbooks. 296 pp. 
 Monnier E., Limpalaër L., Robin A. & Roux C. (2018). A taxonomic iconography of living Conidae. Harxheim: ConchBooks. 2 vols. 1205 pp.
page(s): 346
 Puillandre N., Duda T.F., Meyer C., Olivera B.M. & Bouchet P. (2015). One, four or 100 genera? A new classification of the cone snails. Journal of Molluscan Studies. 81: 1–23

External links
 The Conus Biodiversity website
 Cone Shells - Knights of the Sea
 
 Holotype in MNHN, Paris

luciae
Gastropods described in 1986